Lucia Graves (born 21 July 1943) is a writer and translator.  Born in Devon, England, she is the daughter of writer Robert Graves, and his second wife, Beryl Pritchard (1915–2003).

Biography
Lucia is a translator working in English and Spanish/Catalan. Her translations include the worldwide bestsellers The Shadow of the Wind, The Angel's Game, The Prisoner of Heaven, and "The Labyrinth of the Spirits", by Carlos Ruiz Zafón, and The Columbus Papers. She has translated over 30 volumes.

She has also published a novel, The Memory House, and a memoir entitled A Woman Unknown. These were both originally written in English, but Graves herself did the translations into Spanish.  She said "I find self-translation a rather strange, slightly uncomfortable experience; the line between author and translator becomes blurred".

She grew up on Mallorca from the age of three, speaking English at home, Catalan with locals, and Spanish at school.  "I slipped in and out of my three languages as one enters and exits different-coloured rooms in a house," she writes in her memoir.  As a teenager she attended the International School of Geneva, Switzerland, and subsequently university at Oxford.

In 1967 she married a Catalan musician and settled in Spain, living mainly in Barcelona. They had three daughters.
Her professional translation work began in 1971 with her father’s novel Seven Days in New Crete.
In 1991 she moved from Spain to London where she currently lives with her second husband. There she has continued to do translation, mostly into English, and also wrote her memoir and novel.

Awards and honors
2012 Science Fiction & Fantasy Translation Awards, finalist, translation of Midnight Palace by Carlos Ruiz Zafón

Sources

External links
Lucia Graves at Florin.com

1943 births
Living people
Catalan–English translators
Spanish–English translators
English translators
English women novelists
People from Mallorca
20th-century British translators
20th-century English women writers
20th-century English writers
21st-century British translators
21st-century English women writers
20th-century British writers
21st-century British writers
English women non-fiction writers
Graves family